HBE may refer to:

 Borg El Arab Airport, near Alexandria, Egypt
 Hemoglobin E (HbE)
 His Boy Elroy, an American band
 The Hugh Beaumont Experience, an American band
 Human behavioral ecology
 Hurstbridge railway station, in Victoria, Australia
 Hypnotic Brass Ensemble, an American band
 Hard Boiled Egg, egg that is boiled hard.